Terellia vilis is a species of tephritid or fruit flies in the genus Terellia of the family Tephritidae.

Distribution
Tajikistan, Afghanistan.

References

Tephritinae
Insects described in 1961
Diptera of Asia